Fairhaven Township may refer to the following places in the United States:

 Fairhaven Township, Carroll County, Illinois
 Fairhaven Township, Michigan
 Fair Haven Township, Stearns County, Minnesota

Township name disambiguation pages